Le Petit Journal may refer to:

 Le Petit Journal (newspaper), a French daily newspaper, published 1863–1944
 Le Petit Journal (magazine), a weekly magazine based in Montreal, published 1926–1978
 Le Petit Journal (website), a French-language news website aimed at French speakers living outside France
 Le Petit Journal (Canal+), a French nightly current affairs and entertainment television show